Chalcides thierryi, commonly known as Thierry's cylindrical skink, is a species of lizard in the family Scincidae. The species is indigenous to West Africa.

Etymology
The specific name, thierryi, is in honor of German military officer Gaston Thierry, who served in Togo.

Geographic range
Chalcides thierryi is found in Benin, Burkina Faso, northern Ghana, Mali, Nigeria, Senegal, and Togo.

Habitat
The preferred natural habitat of C. thierryi is savanna.

Reproduction
C. thierryi is viviparous.

References

Further reading
Greenbaum E (2005). "Systematics of West African skinks in the Chalcides thierryi group: Composition, distribution, and redescription of types". African Journal of Herpetology 54 (1): 17–29.
Joger U, Lambert MRK (2002). "Inventory of amphibians and reptiles in SE Senegal, including the Niokola-Koba National Park, with observations of factors influencing diversity". Tropical Zoology 15 (2): 165–185. (Chalcides thierryi, new status as a species).
Loveridge A (1936). "African Reptiles and Amphibians in the Field Museum of Natural History". Zoological Series, Field Museum of Natural History, Chicago 22 (1): 1–122. (Chalcides bottegi thierryi, new status as a subspecies, p. 74).
Tornier G (1901). "Die Crocodile, Schildkröten und Eidechsen in Togo". Archiv für Naturgeschichte 1901 (supplement): 65–88. (Chalcides bottegi var. thierryi, new variety, p. 87). (in German).
Trape J-F, Trape S, Chirio L (2012). Lézards, crocodiles et tortues d'Afrique occidentale et du Sahara. Paris: IRD Orstom. 503 pp. . (in French).

Chalcides
Skinks of Africa
Reptiles of West Africa
Reptiles described in 1901
Taxa named by Gustav Tornier